James Todd may refer to:

James Todd (lawyer) (1786–1863), Pennsylvania lawyer, judge, Attorney-General
James Todd (Canadian settler) (1832–1925), English-born Canadian settler
James Todd (boxer), Welsh boxer
James Todd, alias used by American geologist Clarence King (1842–1901)
James Dale Todd (born 1943), United States federal judge 
James Henthorn Todd (1805–1869), biblical scholar, educator, and Irish historian
James M. Todd (1896–1970), American electrical and consulting engineer 
James Cameron Todd (1863–1915), British Anglican canon and schoolmaster
James Todd (cricketer), English cricketer
James Ruddell-Todd (fl. 1832), English MP
Jimmy Todd (1921–2007), Northern Ireland footballer
Jimmy Todd (Scottish footballer) (1895–1916), Scottish footballer
Jim Todd (born 1952), American basketball coach
Jim Todd (baseball) (born 1947), American pitcher

See also
James Tod (1782–1835), British East India Company officer and Oriental scholar
James Tod (seigneur) (c. 1742–1816), Scottish-Canadian businessman and political figure